Soledad is a Mexican telenovela produced by Valentín Pimstein for Televisa in 1980.

Cast 
Libertad Lamarque as Soledad
Salvador Pineda as Andrés Sánchez Fuentes
Christian Bach as Chelo Sánchez Fuentes
Héctor Bonilla as Jesús Sánchez Fuentes
Edith González as Luisita Sánchez Fuentes
Rosalía Valdés as Daisy
Roberto Cañedo as Bernardo
Nuria Bages as Cinthia
Humberto Zurita as Fernando
Rafael Baledón as Don Felix
Rita Macedo as Rebeca
Connie de la Mora as Marilú
Manuel Capetillo Jr. as.¡ Ramiro Sánchez Fuentes
Roberto Spriu as Lic. Garrido
Pituka de Foronda as Doña Martha
Rebeca Martínez as Tere
Ana Silvia Garza as Meche
Lorena Rivero as Peggy
Abraham Stavans as Sebastián
Flor Procuña as Sandra
Lucianne Silva as Margarita
Virginia Gutiérrez as Carolina
Manuel López Ochoa as Guillermo
Elvira Monsell as Perlita
Ada Carrasco as Justa
Orlando Rodríguez as Anselmo Sánchez Fuentes
Aurora Molina as Laureana
Aurora Cortes as Eulalia
José Flores as Nacho
Rolando Barral as Rolando
Alicia Encinas as Marian Monterani (Nana)
Roberto Ballesteros as Martín
Ana Bertha Espín as Pilar
Alejandro Camacho
José Elías Moreno as Juan

References

External links 

Mexican telenovelas
1980 telenovelas
Televisa telenovelas
Spanish-language telenovelas
1980 Mexican television series debuts
1980 Mexican television series endings